Edgar R. Flores (born 1986) is an American politician and attorney who serves as a member of the Nevada Senate, representing the 2nd district. He previously served in the Nevada Assembly, representing the 28th district, which covers parts of the eastern Las Vegas Valley.

Early life and education
Flores was born to immigrants from Ciudad Juarez, Mexico who were given legal status under the Immigration Reform and Control Act of 1986. He was the second of three children. He graduated from the University of Nevada, Las Vegas in 2008 and from the William S. Boyd School of Law in 2012.

Career 
After graduating from law school, Flores became an immigration attorney. Flores ran for the Assembly in 2014 to succeed Lucy Flores (no relation). As the only declared candidate, he won the election unopposed. In 2016, Flores faced a challenge from Republican Wesley Cornwell. He defeated Cornwell in the general election.

Political positions
During the 2017 legislative session, Flores sponsored a successful bill that would mandate businesses accept green cards as a form of identification.  Furthermore, he has been instrumental in Payday Lending Reform.  He has focused heavily on spearheading consumer protection issues.  In 2015 and 2017 he spearheaded important legislation against predatory businesses that pretend to be lawyers.  In 2015, he passes legislation to help law enforcement curb the Nevada squatter crisis.

In 2021, Flores was the only Democratic Assemblyman to side with all Republicans in voting against a redistricting map derided by certain Hispanic groups.

Electoral history

References

External links
 
 Campaign website
 Legislative website

1986 births
Living people
American politicians of Mexican descent
Hispanic and Latino American state legislators in Nevada
Immigration lawyers
Democratic Party members of the Nevada Assembly
Nevada lawyers
Politicians from Las Vegas
University of Nevada, Las Vegas alumni
William S. Boyd School of Law alumni
21st-century American politicians